The hybrid elm cultivar Ulmus × intermedia 'Improved Coolshade' is a superior selection from 'Coolshade' (U. rubra × U. pumila) and was patented and released by the Sarcoxie Nurseries, Sarcoxie, Missouri, United States, in 1958.

Description
The tree is similar to 'Coolshade', but faster growing.

Pests and diseases
Although reputedly resistant to Dutch elm disease, it had not been (by 1995) widely tested.

Cultivation
'Improved Coolshade' was noted for its drought tolerance. It is not known whether the tree remains in cultivation in North America, nor whether it was introduced to Europe or Australasia.

Synonymy
'Primus' (earlier name for the cultivar).

References

Ulmus × intermedia cultivar
Ulmus articles missing images
Ulmus